Gogosan is a mountain in Gangwon-do, South Korea. Its area extends across the counties of Yeongwol and Jeongseon.

See also
 List of mountains in Korea

Notes

References
 

Mountains of South Korea
Mountains of Gangwon Province, South Korea
zh:高古山